The Galicia national football team was a football team representing Galicia, one of the crown lands of the Austria-Hungary. It was managed by the Polish Football Association, subordinate to the Austrian Football Association. It was not a FIFA member and therefore could not take part in official international competitions. The only match they played on 31 August 1913, losing 2–1 against the national team of Silesia and Moravia. The team is a precursor of today's Poland national team.

Matches

References

Football in Poland
Football in Austria
European national and official selection-teams not affiliated to FIFA
1913 establishments in Poland
1913 establishments in Austria
Sports organizations established in 1913